Chapman is a literary magazine based in Edinburgh, Scotland. It has published many Scottish and international authors, including Iain Crichton Smith, Alasdair Gray, Sorley MacLean and Kathleen Raine. It covers new poetry and short fiction, as well as critical essays and reviews.

It was started in 1970 as The Chapman, a pamphlet edited by George Hardie and Walter Perrie. Robert Calder, Joy Hendry and Walter Perrie edited the magazine during 1975. Joy Hendry began editing the title first in conjunction with Perrie, then solo from Issue 16 in 1976. She was the magazine's editor until 2005.

It is variously known as Chapman magazine, Chapman: Scotland's Quality Literary Magazine, but Chapman is its proper title.

Notable contributors
Richard Burns
Stewart Conn
Alasdair Gray
Duncan Glen
Michael Horovitz
Robert Lofton
Sorley MacLean
Aonghas MacNeacail
Eric Mottram
Kathleen Raine
Iain Crichton Smith

See also
 List of literary magazines
 List of magazines published in Scotland

References

External links
 Chapman

1970 establishments in Scotland
Literary magazines published in Scotland
Magazines established in 1970
Mass media in Edinburgh
Quarterly magazines published in the United Kingdom
Scottish literature